Psychotria macrocarpa is a species of plant in the family Rubiaceae. It is native to Kerala and Tamil Nadu in India.

References

macrocarpa
Flora of Kerala
Flora of Tamil Nadu
Endangered plants
Taxonomy articles created by Polbot